Maleševo is a village in the municipality of Rekovac, Serbia. According to the 2002 census, the village has a population of 146 people.

References

Populated places in Pomoravlje District